Franz Xaver Haberl (12 April 1840, in Oberellenbach (today Mallersdorf-Pfaffenberg), Lower Bavaria – 5 September 1910, in Ratisbon) was a German musicologist, friend of Liszt, Perosi, and Singenberger, cleric, and student of Proske.

He made his classical and theological studies at Passau, Bavaria, where he was ordained priest, 12 August 1862. Showing decided aptitude for music, he was given every opportunity for study of the art, and was entrusted with the direction of music in the seminary. From 1867 to 1870 Haberl resided in Rome, where he was active as choirmaster at the German national church, Santa Maria dell'Anima, and also made historical and archæological researches. From 1871 to 1882 he directed the choir at the Ratisbon cathedral, his incumbency forming one of the most brilliant periods in the history of this famous institute.

Working for church music reform, in 1874 Haberl founded a famous school for church musicians at Regensburg (Ratisbon). This school began with three professors—Dr. Haberl, Dr. Jacob, and Canon Haller—and only three pupils, and attracted reform-minded church music programs. Haberl not only secured permanency for the school in the shape of endowment, but he built next to it a church, dedicated to St. Cecilia, where pupils are given opportunities for practising the knowledge they have acquired in theory.

He fought for the Editio Medicea against the editions of Solesmes and others. In 1868 Haberl re-edited the Medicæa version of the Gregorian chant, and the Holy See declared his edition authentic and official for the Catholic Church. This form of the chant has since been superseded by the "Editio Vaticana."

With Proske, he was a prime mover in the "Caecilia Movement," and helped to edit the fourth volume of Musica Divina.

For thirty years he gathered data and material for a critical edition of the works of Palestrina, completed in 1908 in thirty-three volumes, the first ten of which were prepared by the joint labour of Th. de Witt, J.N. Rauch, Fr. Espagne, and Fr. Commer. A similar edition of the works of Orlando Lasso, undertaken by him in company with Dr. Sanberger, he left unfinished.

As president of the Allgemeiner Cäcilien-Verband für Deutschland (Cecilian Society for Germany), which position he held from 1899 until his death, as editor of Musica sacra and Fliegende Blätter für Kirchenmusik, the official organ of the society, as the author of Magister Choralis, now in the twelfth edition, and of innumerable articles on historical, theoretical, and scientific subjects, but especially as director of the school which he founded, Haberl championed the spirit and authority of the Church in musical matters against modernising influences.

One of Haberl's most famous students was Lorenzo Perosi.

External links
 
 

1840 births
1910 deaths
19th-century German Roman Catholic priests
19th-century German musicologists
20th-century German musicologists
People from Straubing-Bogen
20th-century German Roman Catholic priests